Wascana Creek is a river in the Canadian province of Saskatchewan. It is a tributary of the Qu'Appelle River.

Originating in the fields east of Regina near Vibank, Wascana Creek travels south-east for approximately  before turning back west at Tyvan. The creek then travels in a north-westwardly direction following Highway 33 through Regina, where it was dammed by the Canadian Pacific Railway to create Wascana Lake. The lake was created to supply water for steam locomotives and to create a decorative image in Regina. Below the lake, the creek leaves Regina and ends at the Qu'Appelle River about 1 mile west of Lumsden.

Sherwood Forest Bridge and Albert Memorial Bridge are two of the bridges that cross Wascana Creek. Near the mouth of the river in the Wascana Valley, is a provincial recreation site called Wascana Trails that were developed for use in the 2005 Canada Summer Games.

A 2011 study by Environment Canada found the creek to have high levels of pollution.

Wascana Creek Sub-basin 
Wascana Creek Sub-basin is the name given to Wascana Creek's drainage basin. Along with the Moose Jaw River Watershed, it is one of four sub-basins that make up the Wascana & Upper Qu’Appelle Watersheds; the other three being the Last Mountain Lake Sub-basin, Upper Qu’Appelle Sub-basin, and Lanigan-Manitou Sub-basin. The four sub-basins plus Moose Jaw River drain a total of 23,443 km² of land. The Craven Dam is located downstream from Wascana Creek's mouth on the Qu'Appelle River at the village of Craven.

Wascana Creek and its tributaries drain over 2,200 km² of land. Several small tributaries feed the river, three of which are named.
Manybone Creek
Kronau Creek
Cottonwood Creek

Fish species 
Brook stickleback and fathead minnow can be found in the Wascana Lake portion of the creek.

See also 
 List of rivers of Saskatchewan
 Hudson Bay drainage basin

References

External links 

Rivers of Saskatchewan
Tributaries of Hudson Bay